The three species in the genus Caluromys, commonly known as woolly opossums, are members of the order Didelphimorphia.

Species and subspecies
 Subgenus Mallodelphys
 Derby's woolly opossum, Caluromys derbianus
 Caluromys derbianus aztecus
 Caluromys derbianus centralis
 Caluromys derbianus derbianus
 Caluromys derbianus fervidus
 Caluromys derbianus nauticus
 Caluromys derbianus pallidus
 Brown-eared woolly opossum, Caluromys lanatus
 Caluromys lanatus cicur
 Caluromys lanatus lanatus
 Caluromys lanatus nattereri
 Caluromys lanatus ochropus
 Caluromys lanatus orntus
 Caluromys lanatus vitalinus
 Subgenus Caluromys
 Bare-tailed woolly opossum, Caluromys philander
 Caluromys philander affinis
 Caluromys philander dichurus
 Caluromys philander philander
 Caluromys philander trinitatis

References
 

Opossums
Taxa named by Joel Asaph Allen